Group 24 is a political opposition movement in Tajikistan. It opposes the rule of president Emomali Rahmon. They accuse him of corruption and nepotism.

It was founded in 2012 by businessman and politician Umarali Quvvatov.

History

Protest  
On October 10, 2014, then-leader Quvvatov called for peaceful protests to be held in Dushanbe. The probability for mass protests was estimated as low by analysts who pointed to political apathy and the idea that protest is associated with anarchy, as promoted by the state. On 5 October, authorities suspended the operation of SMS systems and temporarily blocked hundreds of websites including Facebook, YouTube and Russian-language social networks. They increased law enforcement presence in the capital. No protests materialized.

National ban 
Amidst the government crackdown, Group 24 was banned by Tajikistan's Supreme Court on 9 October for alleged extremism. Little justification was provided other than Group 24's continued calls for peaceful protests..

Former members of the group called for the country's supreme court to remove the party from the list of banned extremist groups, arguing that the group poses no threat.

Assassination 
Quvvatov was assassinated on 6 March 2015 in Turkey. His death came two days after a Tajik court sentenced another member of Group 24 to 17 years in prison for attempting to seize power and insulting the president. President Rahmon's opponents accused authorities of orchestrating the assassination. Following Quvvatov's death, the group elected Sharofiddin Gadoev as its new leader.

Repression 
Some Tajik activists were sentenced to lengthy prison terms for their alleged association with Group 24. In March 2015 three people received sentences ranging from 16.5 to 17.5 years. In April, 2015, another two people were sent to prison for 3 and 3.5 years for the alleged organising of Group 24 activities.

References

External links
 Official website

Politics of Tajikistan